The royal ground snake (Erythrolamprus reginae) is a species of snake in the family Colubridae. The species is  endemic to northern South America.

Geographic range
It is found in Venezuela, Peru, and Trinidad and Tobago.

Diet
It feeds on frogs, frog eggs, tadpoles, fish, small birds, and lizards.

References

Further reading
Amaral A (1936). "Colecta herpetologica no centro do Brasil ". Mem. Inst. Butantan 9: 235–246. (Leimadophis reginae macrosoma, new subspecies, p. 238). (in Portuguese).

Linnaeus C (1758). Systema naturæ per regna tria naturæ, secundum classes, ordines, genera, species, cum characteribus, differentiis, synonymis, locis. Tomus I. Editio Decima, Reformata. Stockholm: L. Salvius. 824 pp. (Coluber reginæ, new species, p. 219). (in Latin).
Roze JA (1959). "Taxonomic Notes on a Collection of Venezuelan Reptiles in the American Museum of Natural History". American Museum Novitates (1934): 1–14. ("Leimadophis zweifeli, new species", pp. 4–7 + Figure 1, photograph of holotype, on p. 6).
Wagler J (1824). In: Spix J (1824). Serpentum Brasiliensum species novae ou histoire naturelle des espèces nouvelles de serpens, recueillies et observées pendant le voyage dans l'intérieur du Brésil dans les années 1817, 1818, 1819, 1820, exécuté par ordre de sa Majesté le Roi de Baviére. Munich: F.S. Hübschmann. viii + 75 pp. + Plates I.- XXVI. (Natrix semilineata, new species, p. 33-34 + Plate XI., Figure 2). (in Latin and French).

Erythrolamprus
Snakes of South America
Reptiles of Venezuela
Reptiles of Trinidad and Tobago
Reptiles described in 1758
Taxa named by Carl Linnaeus